μ Sculptoris, Latinized as Mu Sculptoris, is a solitary, orange-hued star in the southern constellation of Sculptor. It is visible to the naked eye as a dim point of light with an apparent visual magnitude of +5.30. This star is located approximately 291 light years from the Sun based on parallax, and it is drifting further away with a radial velocity of +16 km/s.

This object is an aging K-type giant star with a stellar classification of K1 III. Having exhausted the supply of hydrogen at its core, this star expanded and cooled off the main sequence. At present it has 11 times the girth of the Sun. It is a suspected variable star of unknown type, with its brightness measured as varying from magnitude 5.30 down to 5.33. The star has 1.32 times the mass of the Sun and is radiating 61 times the Sun's luminosity from its swollen photosphere at an effective temperature of 4899 K.

References

K-type giants
Suspected variables
Sculptor (constellation)
Sculptoris, Mu
CD-32 17621
222433
116820
8975